Polícia de Segurança Pública (Traditional Chinese: 警察) is a Macanese professional football team which currently competes in the Liga de Elite.

Achievements
Macau Championship: 4
 1949, 1973, 2000, 2005

Current squad

Performance in AFC competitions
Asian Club Championship: 1 appearance
2001: First Round

References

Football clubs in Macau
Police association football clubs